The Zürich 4 and 6 were the first postage stamps issued in continental Europe, on 1 March 1843.  Both were inscribed "Zürich" at the top.  

The 4-rappen stamp was also inscribed "Local-Taxe" at the bottom, since it was intended to pay for letters mailed within the city, while the 6-rappen, inscribed "Cantonal-Taxe", was for use on  letters going anywhere in the canton.

See also
 Postage stamps and postal history of Switzerland
 List of notable postage stamps

Postage stamps of Switzerland